Revolusongs is an EP of cover songs released by Brazilian heavy metal band Sepultura exclusively in Brazil and Japan in 2002. It was released in 2003 through SPV Records as a bonus disc for their Roorback album.

The EP contains seven cover songs. The cover of U2's "Bullet the Blue Sky" was released as a single, but as a part of their next album, Roorback. Revolusongs was later included as a bonus disc on the digipak and vinyl LP editions of Roorback, minus the final song and video tracks.

Reception

The album received good reviews, and due to its limited release, it sold over 15,000 copies.

Track listing

Credits
Andreas Kisser - Lead and Rhythm Guitars
Derrick Green - Lead Vocals
Igor Cavalera - Drums, Percussion, Design
Paulo Jr. - Bass
Sabotage - Additional Vocals (3)
Zé Gonzales - Scratching (3), Programming (3), Producer
Maurício Felício - Assistant Engineer
Ronaldo Frige - Technical Assistance
Estevam Romera - Design, Photography
Alan Douches - Mastering
Steve Evetts - Producer, Engineer, Mixing
Sepultura - Producer

References

Covers EPs
2003 EPs
Sepultura EPs
Universal Records EPs
Albums produced by Steve Evetts